Rosa Dainelli (2 May 1901 – 17 March 1973) was an Italian medical doctor from Cuveglio who was working in Ethiopia during World War II, when the British liberated East Africa from Italian occupation in the Horn of Africa and returned it to the Ethiopian Empire. She actively participated in sabotage campaigns against the British Army.

Historical background

Many Italians fought a guerrilla war in Italian East Africa after the Italian surrender at Gondar of the last regular Italian forces in November 1941. They fought in the hope of an Italian victory with the help of Rommel in Egypt and in the Mediterranean that would originate a possible return of the Axis in Eastern Africa.

Dainelli guerrilla action

She became an active member of the Fronte di Resistenza (Resistance Front), an Italian organization which fought the Allies in the Italian guerrilla war in Ethiopia from December 1941 until the summer of 1943.

In August 1942 (some sources claim the date of attack was actually 15 September 1941.) she managed to enter the main ammunition depot of the British Army in Addis Ababa and blow it up, somehow surviving the huge explosion. She was taken prisoner by the British shortly after. This act of sabotage destroyed the ammunition for the new British Sten submachine gun and delayed the deployment of this stopgap, extremely simple and cheaply made submachine gun that used regular 9x19 mm Parabellum ammunition, for many months. Dainelli was famous as one of the few Italian women who participated actively in the Italian guerrilla operations against the British troops after the East African campaign

After the successful sabotage she was quickly captured with her brother Giulio, and interrogated by the Allied authorities in Ethiopia before eventually being released. After the war, Dainelli moved to Switzerland in 1945, where she worked in Geneva at the "Bureau International de Travail" (Ufficio Internazionale del Lavoro) of the ONU. She was nominated, after the end of the war, for the Italian iron medal of honour ("croce di ferro")

See also
Francesco De Martini
Italian guerrilla war in Ethiopia

Notes

Bibliography 

 Cernuschi, Enrico. La resistenza sconosciuta in Africa Orientale (in Italian). Rivista Storica, dicembre 1994.(Rivista Italiana Difesa)
 O'Kelly, Sebastian. Amedeo - the true story of an Italian's war in Abyssinia 2002 Paperback 
 Rosselli, Alberto. Storie Segrete. Operazioni sconosciute o dimenticate della seconda guerra mondiale (in Italian). Iuculano Editore. Pavia, 2007
 Di Lalla Fabrizio, “Le italiane in Africa Orientale. Storie di donne in colonia” (in Italian). Solfanelli Editore, Chieti, 2014, pp. 93, 143.
 Di Lalla Fabrizio, “Sotto due bandiere. Lotta di liberazione etiopica e resistenza italiana in Africa Orientale” (in Italian). Solfanelli Editore, pp. 153,199, 234.
 Roncari, Giorgio. "Rosa Costanza Danieli. Una vita coraggiosa". Tra memoria e storia (Menta e Rosmarino). Treviso, 2017

Italian people of World War II
History of Ethiopia
1973 deaths
Italian East Africa
Women in World War II
1901 births